Jon Weinbach (born August 13, 1976) is an American film and television writer and producer. He currently works as the executive producer and executive vice president for Mandalay Sports Media, a media and production company that focuses on sports entertainment programming.

{{Infobox person
|birth_name    = Jon Weinbach
|image         = 
|alt           = 
|birth_date    = August 13, 1976
|birth_place   = 
|nationality   = American
|education     = Yale University (B.A.)
|occupation    = Television and Film Producer; Executive Vice-President at Mandalay Sports Media
|known_for     =  
|notable_works = The Last Dance (TV series) The Other Dream Team  The Nagano Tapes: Rewound, Replayed & Reviewed  30 for 30, Sole Man   Straight Outta L.A.
|spouse        = 
|partner       =
|children      =
|parents       = 
|website     = 
}}

Weinbach has produced and/or directed movies and television shows such as The Last Dance, The Other Dream Team, Straight Outta L.A. (30 for 30), Sole Man (30 for 30), L.A. Clippers Dance Squad, The Nagano Tapes: Rewound, Replayed & Reviewed. Weinbach wrote Straight Outta L.A. and  co-wrote The People's Fighters: Teofilo Stevenson and the Legend of Cuban Boxing and The Other Dream Team.

Early life and education
Weinbach grew up in Los Angeles and attended Beverly Hills High School. Growing up in Los Angeles, Weinbach closely followed Los Angeles sports. Weinbach was influenced by the sports culture in Los Angeles during the 1980s and 1990s. He lived in Los Angeles during the Showtime Era of the Los Angeles Lakers, the 1988 Los Angeles Dodgers season, Wayne Gretzky's tenure with the Los Angeles Kings, and during the era of the Los Angeles Raiders. After high school, Weinbach attended Yale University, and graduated in 1998.

Career
Wall Street Journal
After graduating from college, Weinbach worked as a reporter at The Wall Street Journal. During this time, he covered the sports business and entertainment. In 2007, he wrote an article for a special report on The Business of Football, which covered Ohio State Buckeyes football's record-breaking budget. In 2008, he wrote a feature on a secret fantasy football league that included some of the financial world's wealthiest executives.

Television and film production
30 for 30s
In 2010, Weinbach produced a documentary for ESPN’s 30 for 30 series called Straight Outta L.A. The film chronicles the move of the Oakland Raiders to Los Angeles and the impact the team had on Southern California in the 1980s. The film premiered at the Tribeca Film Festival.

In 2015, he co-directed and produced Sole Man for ESPN's 30 for 30. The film is a profile of Sonny Vaccaro, who rose from steel town roots in Pennsylvania to become an influential force in both basketball and the athletic shoe industry.

The Other Dream Team
In 2012, he co-produced The Other Dream Team, a documentary film, that covers the story of the 1992 Lithuania national basketball team and their journey to the bronze medal at the Summer Olympics in Barcelona. The movie was an official selection for the Sundance Film Festival and entered in the U.S. Documentary Competition in 2012.

The Nagano Tapes
In 2018, he wrote and produced The Nagano Tapes: Rewound, Replayed & Reviewed. This documentary film covers how the Czech Republic won the gold medal in the ice hockey tournament of the 1998 Winter Olympic. The film won the "Best Film Out of Cinema" at the Czech Film Critics' Awards in 2018.

The People's Fighter
In 2018, Weinbach executive produced The People's Fighters: Teofilo Stevenson and the Legend of Cuban Boxing. The documentary film examines Teófilo Stevenson's career and the phenomenon of boxing in Cuba. Weinbach said: “This film has all the elements that make the Olympics so fascinating – the intersection of politics, culture, huge personalities and incredible athletic achievement."

The Last Dance
Weinbach co-produced The Last Dance, a 2020 documentary miniseries about the career of Michael Jordan, with particular focus on the 1997–98 Chicago Bulls season. He said of the series: “It’s one thing to have Michael Jordan and it’s another to have this incredible candor with him.”

Metacritic assigned the series a score of 91 out of 100 based on 12 critics, indicating "universal acclaim".

Other Film & TV Projects
In 2013, Weinbach co-executive produced "Bluegrass Kingdom: The Gospel of Kentucky Basketball." The documentary tells the history of the Kentucky Wildcats men's basketball.

In 2014, Weinbach co-executive produced "Every Street United," with Xbox Entertainment. The series followed street soccer players from around the world as they competed to play in a 4v4 street soccer game at the 2014 World Cup. He co-wrote and co-executive produced a sports comedy TV series, "The Rebels," with Amazon Studios. The series followed a woman after her husband suddenly dies and leaves her as the sole owner of a pro-football team.

In 2015, he co-executive produced Shaq Inq, a TV comedy movie, that loosely followed Shaq's business empire. He co-produced "Kareem: Minority Of One," which documents the life and career of former NBA player Kareem Abdul-Jabbar. In 2016, Weinbach wrote and produced Patrick and Zo, which chronicled the relationship between Patrick Ewing and Alonzo Mourning. Weinbach executive produced Undrafted, the stories of young men trying achieve their dream of making it to the NFL. Weinbach was nominated for two Sports Emmy Awards for his work on Undrafted.He produced L.A. Clippers Dance Squad, a reality television series, that featured seven members of a dance team for the Los Angeles Clippers National Basketball Association (NBA) professional basketball team. He said of the show, "The women on this dance squad are pursuing their entertainment dreams, living full lives in L.A., and performing for huge crowds. We’re incredibly excited to team up with E! and the Clippers to showcase this alluring side of the sports world."

In 2018, he produced a baseball documentary, “Walk-Off Stories: Improbably Gibson," which documents Kirk Gibson's 1988 World Series home run.

In 2019, he served as executive producer for "We are LAFC," a ten-part all-access documentary series on Los Angeles FC's inaugural season.

In 2020, Weinbach executive produced Rulon Gardner Won’t Die.'' The film documents Rulon Gardner's life story from growing up in rural Wyoming to his success at the 2000 Olympic Games in Sydney, where he defeated Aleksandr Karelin and achieved the ‘miracle on the mat.’

Awards

References

External links
 The Sundance Project 2012: The Other Dream Team (Interview with Jon Weinbach and Marius Markevicius)

1976 births
Film producers from California
Television producers from California
Living people
Businesspeople from Los Angeles
Yale University alumni
People from Beverly Hills, California
Skydance Media people